Björn Olof Lennartson Kurtén  (19 November 1924 – 28 December 1988) was a Finnish  vertebrate paleontologist, belonging to the Swedish-speaking minority of his country.

Early life and education
Kurtén was born in Vaasa.

Career
He was a professor in paleontology at the University of Helsinki from 1972 up to his death in 1988. He also spent a year as lecturing guest professor at Harvard University in 1971.

In Not from the Apes (1971) Kurtén argued that man's development has been separate from the apes since the Miocene, and that man did not descend from anthropoids, but rather the reverse:

He was also the author of a  series of books about modern man's encounter with Neanderthals, such as Dance of the Tiger (1978, 1980). When asked what genre these works belonged in, Kurtén coined the term paleofiction to describe his oeuvre. The genre was popularized by Jean M. Auel in her Earth's Children series of books. He received several awards for his books popularizing science, among others the Kalinga Prize from UNESCO.

In the 1980s, Kurtén also hosted a 6-part TV series about the ice age, co-produced by several Scandinavian TV channels.

Partial bibliography

 Pleistocene Mammals of Europe (Transaction Publishers, 1968; Routledge, 2017)
Istiden (The Ice Age) (Forum, 1969)
Not from the Apes (Pantheon, 1971)
The Age of Mammals (Columbia University Press, NY, 1973)
The Cave Bear Story: Life and Death of a Vanished Animal (Columbia University Press, NY, 1976)
Den svarta tigern (1978) (Dance of the Tiger, 1980)
Pleistocene Mammals of North America (1980), with Elaine Anderson
Mammutens rådare (1982) (Singletusk)
How to Deep-Freeze a Mammoth (1986)
On Evolution and Fossil Mammals (Columbia University Press, 1988)
De skuldlösa mördarna (1987) (The Innocent Assassins, Columbia University Press, 1991)
Before the Indians, Columbia University Press, 1988, softbound, 8 1/2 by 11"
Ad
Our Earliest Ancestors (Columbia University Press, 1993), 

Kurtén also published some fifty scientific works, two of them in collaboration with the Spanish paleontologist Miquel Crusafont Pairó.

References

External links
 

1924 births
1988 deaths
Finnish paleontologists
Writers of fiction set in prehistoric times
Swedish-speaking Finns
20th-century novelists
Finnish expatriates in the United States
Kalinga Prize recipients